The Sunday Times Rich List 2022 is the 34th annual survey of the wealthiest people resident in the United Kingdom, published by The Sunday Times online on 20 May 2022 and in print on 22 May 2022.

The list was edited by Robert Watts who succeeded long-term compiler Philip Beresford in 2017. He noted of the 2022 list: "While many of us are experiencing the greatest cost of living squeeze we can remember, the super-rich have had another record year."

The List was widely reported by other media.

Top 10 fortunes

See also 
 Forbes list of billionaires

References

External links 
 Sunday Times Rich List

Sunday Times Rich List
2022 in the United Kingdom